Numerous plants have been introduced to Nevada in the United States, and many of them have become invasive species. The following are some of these species:

See also
Invasive species in the United States

External links
USDA PLANTS Database USDA database showing county distribution of plant species in the US
InvasiveSpecies.gov Information from the US National Invasive Species Council

Flora of Nevada
Environment of Nevada
Natural history of Nevada
Invasive plants
Nevada